Gambian may refer to:
 Something of, from, or related to the country of the Gambia
 Gambian people, a person from the Gambia, or of Gambian descent
 Culture of the Gambia
 Gambian cuisine

See also
 
Languages of the Gambia

Language and nationality disambiguation pages